Compton Domvile may refer to:

 Sir Compton Domvile, 2nd Baronet (c. 1650–1721), Irish politician, MP for County Dublin
 Sir Compton Domvile, 1st Baronet (c. 1775–1857), British politician, MP for Okehampton and Plympton Erle
 Compton Domvile (Royal Navy officer) (1842–1924), British naval commander
 Sir Compton Meade Domvile, 4th Baronet (1857–1935) of the Domvile Baronets

See also
 Domvile (surname)